Surrey Police is the territorial police force responsible for policing the county of Surrey in South East England.

The force is currently led by Chief Constable Gavin Stephens. Previously the force was led by Nick Ephgrave who left the force to re-join the Metropolitan Police. This was announced by the county PCC on 13 December 2018.

Previous to this, the chief constable was Lynne Owens, Surrey's first female chief constable. Owens left in December 2015.

The force has its headquarters at Mount Browne, Guildford, Surrey.

History 
On 1 January 1851, the Surrey Constabulary began its policing of the county with a total of 70 officers, the youngest of whom was 14 years old.  The first Chief Constable was H. C. Hastings, who served in this capacity for 48 years.  Originally Guildford, Reigate and Godalming had separate borough police forces.  The Reigate and Guildford forces were merged into Surrey's in 1943.

Today
Part of the present force area was originally part of the Metropolitan Police District, and was only transferred to the control of Surrey Police from the Metropolitan Police in 2000. This includes the boroughs of Epsom and Ewell, Spelthorne and part of Reigate and Banstead and Elmbridge. Surrey Police was divided into three divisions but in 2010 became a single division, and as of March 2014 is policed by 1,938 regular police officers, in addition to 182 Special Constables and 153 Police Community Support Officers (see table below for more information). Surrey has one of the lowest crime rates in England and Wales. It has now reverted to three area divisions.

For 2017/18, Surrey Police has total expenditure of £224.1m, of which £183.2m goes on employee costs, £27.3m on supplies and services, £8.8m on premises, and £4.8m on transport. It also has £11.1m of income, resulting in "gross expenditure" of £213m.

The last permanent Chief Constable of Surrey Police was Nick Ephgrave, appointed in July 2016. He had been temporary Chief Constable since December 2015 and was previously Deputy Chief Constable, having been in that role since July 2013. Before this he was a Commander in the Metropolitan Police. The previous Chief Constable of Surrey Police was Lynne Owens, who left to become the head of the National Crime Agency.

Surrey Police has four main divisions: three area divisions, Northern, Eastern, and Western; and a specialist crime/ops division. Within the three division are multiple borough teams. Typically each borough will have a Neighbourhood Specialist Team (formerly they Safer Neighbourhood Team) and a Neighbourhood Policing Team (Formerly the Area Patrol Team/Targeted Patrol Team/Response). These borough teams are supported by investigative teams which span the whole division, this being the Criminal Investigation Department (CID) and the Safeguarding Investigation Unit (SIU).

The specialist crime division is often referred to as OPS, and includes specialist units. This being the Roads Policing Unit (RPU), Tactical Firearms Unit (TFU), Specialist Dog Handlers, Crime Scene Investigation Officers (formerly SOCOs).

There are further force wide teams, some of which are now joint teams with Sussex Police, including the Paedophile and OnLine Investigation Team (POLIT), Major Crime Investigation Team (MCIT, Sussex/Surrey Joint team), Sexual Offences Investigation Team (SOIT) and then a range of support services typical of many forces.

Notes:
1. All figures are official Home Office figures.
2. All figures are full-time equivalents apart from for special constables which are a headcount.
3. Figures apply to 31 March of that year, e.g., 2008/09 figures are for 31 March 2009.
4. Designated Officers that are not PCSOs have one of three roles: investigation officer, detention officer or escort officer.

Senior people

Police and crime commissioners
The first election for Surrey Police and Crime Commissioner took place on 15 November 2012. Kevin Hurley (independent, stood under the label "Zero Tolerance Policing ex Chief"), who was a retired Metropolitan Police borough commander, was elected. He defeated candidates from Labour, the Conservatives, the Liberal Democrats, UKIP, plus an independent.

The second election took place on 5 May 2016. The Conservative candidate, David Munro, was elected. He defeated Jamie Goldrick, independent; Kevin Hurley; Camille Juliff, independent; Howard Kaye, Labour; Paul Kennedy, Liberal Democrat; and Julia Searle, UKIP.

Chief constables
Chief constables have been:
 1851–1899: Captain Hastings
 1899–1930: Captain Mowbray Lees Sant
 1930–1946: Major Geoffrey Nicholson
 1946–1956: Joseph Simpson (later Sir Joseph Simpson)
 1956–1968: Herman Rutherford
 1968–1982: Sir Peter Matthews
 1982–1991: Brian Hayes
 1991–1997: David Williams
 1998–2000: Ian Blair
 2000–2004: Denis O'Connor
 2004–2008: Robert Quick
 2009–2011: Mark Rowley
 2012–2015: Lynne Owens
 2016–2019: Nick Ephgrave
 2019–present: Gavin Stephens

Ranks

Surrey Police has the following ranks. Every rank from constable to chief superintendent has a detective equivalent. These confer no additional powers or authority from their uniform equivalents.

 Chief constable
 Deputy chief constable
 Assistant chief constable
 Chief superintendent
 Superintendent
 Chief inspector
 Inspector
 Sergeant
 Constable

Air operations unit
Surrey has air operations covered by the National Police Air Service. The helicopter callsign NPAS15 which predominately covers the Surrey Policing area is based at Redhill Aerodrome and also covers the Sussex, West Hampshire and Essex Area.

Surrey Police Museum
To help celebrate its 150th anniversary, a museum portraying the history of the Force was opened at Mount Browne, the Surrey Police's headquarters in Guildford.  Surrey resident Sir Michael Caine, CBE, opened the museum on 22 October 2001.  Displays include artefacts and touch-screen technology, all tracing the history of the Force up to the present day.

Training of new recruits

Surrey Police now operates the PLC (police, law & community) course method of training and recruitment. This course ensures that potential recruits already possess knowledge of police law before applying to join Surrey Police. The course is run by several colleges in Surrey, as well as the University of Portsmouth. Although the PLC certificate can be obtained with a pass mark of 40% in the final examination, Surrey Police require a pass mark of 60% to become eligible to reach the application stage of the recruitment process.

The course allows the training phase of a police officer to be reduced by 15 weeks.

Complaints
There were 710 complaint cases for Surrey Police in 2009/10. This is a 206% change on the 2003/04 figure. This is the second highest increase (after Northamptonshire) of all 43 forces in England and Wales. For comparison, the average change across forces in England and Wales over the same period was 113%.  Surrey Police have been condemned by a coroner's jury over the death of Terry Smith who was restrained and put in a spit hood and kept in restraints for over two hours despite saying repeatedly that he could not breathe.

Proposed merger with Sussex Police
Under controversial merger plans announced by then Home Secretary, Charles Clarke, in 2006, the number of police forces in England and Wales would have been cut from 43 to 24. Proposals put forward on 20 March 2006 would have seen the Surrey force merged with Sussex Police to form a single strategic police force for the area.

Police authorities had until 7 April 2006 to respond to the plans; the Home Secretary then announced on 11 April 2006 that Surrey Police and Sussex Police would merge by 2008. However, on 12 July 2006, a Government minister announced that all proposed police merger plans in England and Wales were on hold.

Although, as of 2018, there are no plans to merge Surrey and Sussex Police into one force, the two organisations do have certain specialist departments which are shared across both force areas such as the firearms & roads policing units and alongside major investigations.

Crime and detection rates

Surrey has the joint seventh lowest crime rate (with one other force) of the 43 force areas in England and Wales, with 55 crimes per 1,000 population. In the year to the end of March 2012 there were 61,757 crimes recorded in Surrey, according to Office for National Statistics figures published in July 2012. This is a 5.2% drop on 2010/11 when there were 65,125 crimes recorded in Surrey.

Despite having the joint seventh lowest crime rate, the detection rate for offences was the joint second lowest (with one other force) of the 43 forces in England and Wales, with a rate of 20 percent. The average for England and Wales was 27 percent.

Future of Surrey Police

In a report published by HM Inspectorate of Constabulary in July 2011, the impact on the number of police officers and staff partly due to the reduction to Surrey Police's budget following the comprehensive spending review is as follows:

Notable cases

 Guildford Four and Maguire Seven
 Deaths at Deepcut army barracks
 Murder of Milly Dowler
 Operation Arundel and Operation Ravine

Breakdown of officer numbers

Road casualties in Surrey

As well as preventing and detecting crime, Surrey Police say that "dealing with road accidents forms a large part of our job, or at least taking measures to try and prevent them". The following table shows the number of casualties, grouped by severity, on Surrey's roads over recent years.

Criticism by the IPCC

Lack of investigation of phone hacking

In criticism widely reported in the media, Deborah Glass, Deputy Chair of the IPCC, said in a six-page report regarding the hacking in 2002 of the phone of the murdered Milly Dowler:

"It is apparent from the evidence that there was knowledge of this at all levels within the investigation team.

"There is equally no doubt that Surrey Police did nothing to investigate it; nobody was arrested or charged in relation to the alleged interception of those messages either in 2002 or subsequently, until the Operation Weeting arrests in 2011.

"Phone hacking was a crime in 2002 and it should have been investigated. [...] We have not been able to uncover any evidence, in documentation or witness statements, of why and by whom that decision [not to investigate] was made: former senior officers in particular appear to have been afflicted by a form of collective amnesia about this." She also said: "In view of the widespread knowledge uncovered in this investigation, we consider that it is scarcely credible that no one connected to the Milly Dowler investigation recognised the relevance and importance of the knowledge that Surrey Police had in 2002, before this information was disclosed by Operation Weeting."

Return of firearms used in double murder

In Farnham in February 2014, John Lowe murdered Christine and Lucy Lee, using one of his firearms that had been returned to him by Surrey Police. In October 2014, Lowe was convicted of their murders and received a life sentence with a minimum term of 25 years.

Two independent reports by Hampshire Constabulary and North Yorkshire Police criticised the decision to return his firearms, which prompted the IPCC to launch an independent investigation. This investigation concluded in February 2016 and it published its findings in a 73-page report in April 2017. IPCC associate commissioner Tom Milsom said: "Our investigation paints a deeply concerning portrait of how Surrey Police's firearms licensing team operated at that time. We found a unit which lacked the necessary training and processes to manage such a serious responsibility, staffed by individuals who were failing to undertake their duties with rigour and due consideration."

Two staff members left Surrey Police as a result of this investigation, one being dismissed for gross misconduct and the other retiring before a hearing for gross misconduct could take place.

The IPCC also conducted a separate independent investigation into complaints made by Stacey Banner, the daughter of Christine Lee and sister of Lucy Lee, who was arrested in a separate incident weeks after the murders. The IPCC found that a detective constable and a detective sergeant had cases to answer for misconduct and a detective inspector for gross misconduct.

See also
List of law enforcement agencies in the United Kingdom, Crown Dependencies and British Overseas Territories
Law enforcement in the United Kingdom

Other Surrey emergency services
 Surrey Fire & Rescue Service
 South East Coast Ambulance Service
 SURSAR

References

External links

 Surrey Police at HMICFRS

 Webcasts of management meetings between PCC and Chief Constable

Police forces of England
Police
Organizations established in 1851
1851 establishments in England